The race-built galleon was a type of war ship built in England from 1570 until about 1590.

Queen's ships built in England by Sir John Hawkins and his shipbuilders, Richard Chapman, Peter Pett and Mathew Baker from 1570 were galleons of a "race-built" design. The description derived from their "raced" or razed fore-and aft-castles, which, combined with their greater length in relation to their beam, gave them a purposeful, sleek look.  Their builders described them as having "the head of a cod and the tail of a mackerel". These ships were purposely designed and built to the new design, not razeed older galleons. In 1570 Hawkins began a partnership with Richard Chapman to build or rebuild warships for the Queen's Navy Board at Deptford Dockyard. The prototype of these new style galleons was the 295-ton Foresight in 1570, built by Chapman. Her success was followed in 1573 by the 360-ton Dreadnought (built by Matthew Baker) and 350-ton Swiftsure (built by Peter Pett). In 1577 the 464-ton Revenge was built, together with the smaller (132-ton) Scout. Following Hawkins's appointment as Treasurer of the Navy in 1578, further vessels along similar lines emerged during the next decade, as the Dainty in 1588. All these ships were to do sterling service during the fight against the Spanish Armada.

References

Naval sailing ship types
Nautical terminology
Naval warfare
History of the Royal Navy
Galleons
Tall ships